UFC 31: Locked and Loaded  was a mixed martial arts event held by the Ultimate Fighting Championship at the Trump Taj Mahal in Atlantic City, New Jersey on May 4, 2001. The event was seen live on pay per view in the United States, and later released on home video.

History
The card was headlined by a heavyweight title bout between Randy Couture and Pedro Rizzo. A welterweight title bout between Pat Miletich and Carlos Newton also occurred. The card featured the first appearance of future UFC Welterweight Champion Matt Serra, the professional debut of future multi-divisional UFC Champion B.J. Penn, and Kevin Randleman's first fight in Light Heavyweight.

UFC 31 again saw reformed weight classes, adopting the current standard under the new Unified Rules of Mixed Martial Arts, set by the New Jersey State Athletic Control Board a month earlier in April 2001. Bantamweight was renamed Lightweight and raised from 150 to 155. Welterweights were now at 170, Middleweights at 185, and Light Heavyweights at 205.

Dana White has said on many occasions that this was one of the best fight cards ever mainly due to the main event and the bout between Matt Serra and Shonie Carter which involved the infamous backfist finish.

Results

See also 
 Ultimate Fighting Championship
 List of UFC champions
 List of UFC events
 2001 in UFC

References

External links
 Official UFC website

Ultimate Fighting Championship events
2001 in mixed martial arts
Mixed martial arts in New Jersey
Sports competitions in Atlantic City, New Jersey
2001 in sports in New Jersey